Pakhomenko is a Ukrainian surname. Notable people with the surname include:

 Igor Pakhomenko (born 1992), Russian gymnast
 Maria Pakhomenko (1937–2013), Soviet and Russian singer

See also
 

Ukrainian-language surnames